The National Unity Brigades (Kata'ib al-Wehda al-Watania) was an alliance of Syrian rebel groups that participated in the Syrian Civil War. The group was formed in August 2012. Known for its non-sectarianism, the group included rebels from minority groups such as Christians, Druze, Ismailis, and Alawites. The goal of the group was to establish a civil, democratic state for "all ethnicities and social identities".

Member groups
Many of the units in the National Unity Brigades are named after Syrian nationalist and Syrian independence figures.

Subgroups in the Idlib and Latakia governorates
 Martyrs of Mount Wastani Brigade
 Martyr Muhammad Sultan Battalion
 Martyr Raed Sultan Battalion
 Ansar Battalion
 Free Detainees Battalion
 Martyrs of Janudia Battalion
 Martyrs of Bidama Brigade
 Free Men of Bidama Battalion
 Caliphate Brigade
 Martyrs of Freedom Battalion
 Banners of the Revolution Battalion
 "We are all Syrians" Brigade
 Hawks of Islam Battalion
 Northern Storm Battalion
 Loire Mountain Battalion
 Swords of Islam Battalion
Subgroups in the Hama Governorate
 Martyrs of Salamiyah City Brigade
 Yusuf al-'Azma Battalion
 Fawzi al-Qawuqji Battalion
 Rashid ad-Din Sinan Battalion
 Salamiya Youth Battalion
 Martyr Yusuf al-'Azma Company
Subgroups in the Suwayda and Rif Dimashq governorates
 Yusuf al-'Azma Brigade
 Abd al-Rahman Shahbandar Brigade
 Martyr Tamer al-Awam Battalion
 Martyrs of the Syrian Revolution Brigade
 Ahmad Maryoud Brigade
 Damascus Martyrs Brigade

Structure, funding, external support, and relations with other groups
The first plans of forming the National Unity Brigades was discussed by rebels in June 2012. Some of the rebels in the group were former activists and protesters. They began to collect money, organized the units, and announced the formation of the group in August 2012. In October 2012, the National Unity Brigades rejected foreign political support. The group was a loose coalition instead of a unified group and it received funding from various rebel military councils in Syria. The group claimed to have good relations with all other rebel groups "without exception" and have fought in battles "side by side with Islamist and Jihadist brigades".

In January 2013, 200 fighters of the Ahfad al-Rasul Brigades on Mount Zawiya requested to join the National Unity Brigades. The request was denied due to the lack of sufficient resources such as ammunition for the group.

The group recognized the Supreme Military Council, although it originally did not receive any support from it. On 18 May 2013, the Free Syria Front was formed by SMC commander Colonel Qasim Saad al-Din. Many groups in the National Unity Brigades joined the Free Syria Front. By October 2013, the NUB became an "autonomous coalition" within the FSF.

In February 2013, the National Unity Brigades refused to cooperate with the al-Nusra Front. A fighter in the group stated that "al-Qaeda is hijacking the revolution". Tensions rose between the two groups on Mount Wastani in western Idlib. On 19 June 2013, al-Nusra Front fighters killed two civilians in the area. After this, 50 al-Nusra fighters attempted to enter a village west of Darkoush, but was stopped at a checkpoint manned by the Martyrs of Mount Wastani Brigade, part of the National Unity Brigades. Following this incident, 10 rebel groups on Mount Wastani formed a coalition against al-Nusra and forced them to withdraw from the area by October 2013:
 Martyrs of Mount Wastani Brigade
 Northern Countryside Brigade
 Free Men of Mount Wastani Brigade
 Ghufran Brigade
 Glories of Islam Brigade
 Ahbad al-Rasul Brigade
 Happy Martyrs Brigade
 Free Zawiya Brigade
 Free Battalion
 Jisr al-Shughur Military Council

In July 2014, the al-Nusra Front attacked the Martyrs of Mount Wastani Brigade near the mountain range, resulting in casualties from both sides.

References

Anti-government factions of the Syrian civil war
Anti-ISIL factions in Syria
Military units and formations disestablished in 2014
Military units and formations established in 2012
Free Syrian Army